Ben Geurens (born 24 December 1979) is an Australian actor.

Biography
Geurens graduated from NIDA in 2004. At drama school his credits include The Return, Romeo and Juliet, Much Ado About Nothing, and Who's Afraid of the Working Class.

Roles
Geurens is best known for playing suburban rascal Toby Mangel on the soap opera Neighbours from 1990 to 1993. He then appeared in the television series The Man from Snowy River as Michael O'Neil and the movie Body Melt as Brandon Noble. He made guest appearances in other series such as Blue Heelers.

Geurens played constable Ash Nader in Home and Away in late 2006 and early 2007 and a detective in the final series of McLeod's Daughters in 2008. He also appeared in the Melbourne Theatre Company's production of Entertaining Mr Sloane, in which he played the lead role of Mr Sloane and also in The History Boys as Dakin.

In 2009, Geurens starred in the comedy series The Jesters as Steve Morris and had guest roles on All Saints and Packed to the Rafters.

He portrayed Gideon Blackburn in the historical-fantasy drama Reign.
He also plays the part of The Necromancer on Legacies.
Geurens plays the lead role Ryan Black in the crime-thriller film Locusts.

Filmography

Film

Television

Staff credits

References

External links
 

1979 births
Australian male child actors
Australian male television actors
Australian male stage actors
Male actors from Melbourne
Living people
National Institute of Dramatic Art alumni